Asthitva is a 2016 Kannada thriller film directed by Nuthan Umesh, who had earlier directed Krishnan Marriage Story. The movie is a remake of the 2012 Tamil thriller Naan which itself was inspired by the 1999 movie The Talented Mr. Ripley. The film is produced by B.S.Vishwa cariappa under production company VSan Vision  stars Yuvraj, Prajwal Pooviah, and Duniya Rashmi in the lead role.

The plot revolves around Ram an orphan (Hindu) takes on the identity of Raheem(Muslim), a dead MBBS aspirant and starts to live a lie. Would he be able to keep on staying free from the trap of untruths that he turns?

Cast
Yuvraj as Ram (alias Rahim)
Prajwal Pooviah as Khushi
Madhusudhan as Krish
Shine Shetty as Vicky
Sonu Gowda
Duniya Rashmi
Shankar Ashwath
K. S. Shridar
Shashidhar Kote
Rajesh Nataranga
Madhusudan Vijaykumar

Soundtrack
The music was composed by Vijay Antony who composed the original film retaining all the tunes. All lyrics were written by V. Nagendra Prasad.

References

External links
 

2016 films
Indian crime thriller films
2010s Kannada-language films
Kannada remakes of Tamil films
Films scored by Vijay Antony
2016 thriller films